Hermiston may refer to:

 Hermiston, Edinburgh, Scotland
 Hermiston, Oregon, U.S.
Hermiston Butte
 Weir of Hermiston (1896), an unfinished novel by Robert Louis Stevenson

People
 Andrew Douglas of Hermiston (died before 1277), Scottish nobleman
 James Anderson of Hermiston (1739–1808), Scottish agriculturist, journalist and economist
 Jim Hermiston (born 1947), professional footballer and police officer

See also